Junín is a settlement in Barbacoas Municipality, Nariño Department in Colombia.

Climate
Junín has a relatively cool due to elevation and extremely wet tropical rainforest climate (Af). It is the wettest place in the department of Nariño.

References

Geography of Nariño Department